This is a timeline of sport in South Africa. For other events see the list of years in South Africa.

Pre Union of South Africa
 Sport in pre-union South Africa

Union of South Africa 
1910s: 1910 - 1911 - 1912 - 1913 - 1914 - 1915 - 1916 - 1917 - 1918 - 1919
1920s: 1920 - 1921 - 1922 - 1923 - 1924 - 1925 - 1926 - 1927 - 1928 - 1929
1930s: 1930 - 1931 - 1932 - 1933 - 1934 - 1935 - 1936 - 1937 - 1938 - 1939
1940s: 1940 - 1941 - 1942 - 1943 - 1944 - 1945 - 1946 - 1947 - 1948 - 1949
1950s: 1950 - 1951 - 1952 - 1953 - 1954 - 1955 - 1956 - 1957 - 1958 - 1959
1960s: 1960

Republic of South Africa 
1960s: 1961 - 1962 - 1963 - 1964 - 1965 - 1966 - 1967 - 1968 - 1969
1970s: 1970 - 1971 - 1972 - 1973 - 1974 - 1975 - 1976 - 1977 - 1978 - 1979
1980s: 1980 - 1981 - 1982 - 1983 - 1984 - 1985 - 1986 - 1987 - 1988 - 1989
1990s: 1990 - 1991 - 1992 - 1993

Post Apartheid 
1990s: 1994 - 1995 - 1996 - 1997 - 1998 - 1999
2000s: 2000 - 2001 - 2002 - 2003 - 2004 - 2005 - 2006

References
Most sources for pages linking off this page are Wikipedia itself, and the following books and websites:
 Historical dictionary of South Africa, Christopher Saunders, Nicholas Southey' 2nd Edition, Lanham, Md., London: Scarecrow Press
 News24
 South Africa History Archive
 SA Rugby

Years in South Africa
Sport